Italian Pakistani or Pakistani Italian may refer to:
Italy-Pakistan relations (c.f. "an Italian-Pakistani treaty")
Pakistanis in Italy
Italians in Pakistan
Mixed race people of Italian and Pakistani descent in any country
Multiple citizenship of both Italy and Pakistan